The North Riding Football League is an English football league that was founded in 2017 by the merger of the former Teesside Football League and Eskvale & Cleveland League.

The league has four divisions – the Premier Division (which stands at level 11 of the English football league system), Division One, Under 19 Division and Women's Division. The men's regional team won the 2017-18 FA Inter-League Cup, which qualified the team for the 2019 UEFA Regions' Cup.

Current member clubs (2022–23)

Premier Division
Bedale AFC
Boro Rangers Reserves
Cleveland (Sat)
Fishburn Park
Grangetown Boys Club
Kader
Northallerton Town Reserves
Redcar Athletic Reserves
Redcar Newmarket
South Park Rangers
Staithes Athletic
St Mary's 1947
Stokesley Sports Club
Thirsk Falcons
Yarm and Eaglescliffe

Division One
Boro Rangers Development
Darlington Railway Athletic Reserves
Great Ayton United Royals
Kader Athletic
Lealholm
Loftus Athletic
Marske United Reserves
New Marske
Redcar Town Reserves
Thirsk Falcons Development
T.I.B.S.
Whinney Banks YCC
Whitby Fishermens Society
Wolviston
Yarm & Eaglescliffe Development

Womens Premier
Boro Rangers
Guisborough Town Reserves
Huntington Rovers
Kader
Middlesbrough Development
Northallerton Town
Old Malton St Marys
Poppleton
Redcar Athletic
Richmond Town
York City Development
York St John University

Champions

References

External links
Official site

Football leagues in England
Amateur association football
Football competitions in Yorkshire